Bernard Fisher may refer to:

People
 Bernard Fisher (footballer) (born 1934), English footballer
 Bernard Fisher (scientist) (1918–2019), researcher in cancer chemotherapy
 Bernard F. Fisher (1927–2014), U.S. Air Force colonel and Medal of Honor recipient
 Red Fisher (sportsman) (Bernard Herbert Fisher, 1914–2006), American sporting goods retailer, columnist and poet, later a radio and television personality in Canada

Other
 MV Maj. Bernard F. Fisher (T-AK-4396), U.S. Navy vessel named for Bernard Francis Fisher

Fisher, Bernard